Zhang Huimin (张慧敏; born 1999) is a Chinese girl who completed a  run from the southern Chinese province of Hainan to Beijing when she was eight years old.

Huimin managed to arrive after just 51 days.

In 2009, Huimin set out to set a record for the Chinese government. She was to run until continuously only stopping for 15 minutes to rest every 6 hours. Reports say that she covered 541 miles at which point she collapsed the after running 143 hours. This counted against her next rest period. While she slept, they bandaged her feet and massaged her legs. It was revealed that her feet had swollen three sizes larger than normal. She was able to continue until she collapsed for the final time after 156 hours and running 579 miles.

Her father, who has been accused of forcing the girl to run these distances, has denied all claims, saying "I make the training fun for her. I don't push her...she loves to run. Many people don't understand us", saying that they would "soldier on" regardless of what people think.

References

1999 births
Living people
Chinese female long-distance runners
Runners from Sichuan